The Eszterházy Károly Catholic University  (-2021-08-01) was founded in 1774 in Eger. In 1989 it was renamed after its founder Bishop Károly Eszterházy. Number of students is 8602.

The establishment's buildings are scattered through the city, the largest and oldest among them was built in baroque style lyceum ("A" building).

Previous names: Lyceum, Teacher Training College (1828–), College of Education(in the Lyceum), from 1962 Teacher Training College of Eger, from 1969 Ho Si Minh Teacher Training College, from 1990 Eszterházy Károly Teacher Training College, from January 1. 2000 Eszterházy Károly College (-2016-06-30), Eszterházy Károly University of Applied Sciences.

History

Ferenc Baróczky decided in 1761, that his seminary in Eger will be developed into a similar university as the University of Nagyszombat established by Péter Pázmány which is a three faculty (theology, liberal arts, law) university. The blueprints of the building were made by Josef Ignaz Gerl (1734–1798).

His Successor Károly Eszterházy, added a medical faculty to this concept, the building was supposed to be the first 4 faculty university in Hungary. To found the university the permission of Maria Theresa was required, though she rejected it because of the negative responses from his predecessor Ferenc Baróczky. In hope of success Eszterházy continued the building according to the original plans, and in 1769 the fourth faculty was established and it was the first medical studies institution in Hungary. Even though Maria Theresa made the University of Nagyszombat into the base of medical studies (the city didn't even have a hospital to begin with, and in Eger the hospital was directed by Ferenc Markhot), the Scola Medicianis of Eger's right to doctoral degree was revoked, which caused the closure of the institution in 1775.

In 1774 teaching resumed in the new building. However, in 1777 Ratio Educationis put the establishment in a difficult situation: Maria Theresa moved the University of Nagyszombat to Buda, and declared that there can be only one university in Hungary. From this point on the institution was called a lyceum.

Philosophy and law education was discontinued in 1784 and seminary was moved to Pest in 1786. However, Eszterhazy never gave up on his plans. After the death of Joseph II, in 1790 philosophy was reinstated, along with law and seminary. In 1828 archbishop Johann Ladislaus Pyrker established the first Hungarian teacher education. Later, in 1852 it was moved to the Lyceum and continued until 1948. From 1921 on the initiative of Archbishop Louis Szmrecsányi
Roman Catholic Boys Higher Commercial School also functioned in the building.

The college of education has moved to the Lyceum in 1949, when the institution, founded by the Hungarian Parliament in 1948, has moved from Debrecen to Eger. The college's philosophy was based on the academic tradition and ideals of renowned founder professors who valued spiritual guidance, openness to the future, and created a high-quality establishment.

The teacher training college became a national college-level teacher training institutions in half a century. Teacher training programs took on almost every versions and also launched some of the first multi-disciplinary program for the national teacher training. During its operation more than thirty thousand college-educated professionals were trained for the Hungarian education and society. Students enrol from all counties in the country and also from abroad.

Faculties of the College

Faculty of Humanities

Institute of Linguistic and Literary Studies
Department of Applied Communication Science
Department of General Applied Linguistics
Department of Hungarian Literature

Doctoral School of Historical Sciences

Institute of History
Department of Hungarian History: Medieval and Modern Period
Department of Hungarian History: Modern Period
Department of World History: Ancient and Medieval Period
Department of Auxiliary Historical Sciences
Department of World History: Modern and Current Period

Independent Departments
Department of American Studies
Department of British Studies
Department of Music
Department of Philosophy
Department of French Language and Literature
Department of German Language and Literature
Department of Visual Arts

Faculty of Teacher Training and Knowledge Technology

Institute of Media Informatics
Department of Informatics
Department of Motion Picture Culture
Department of Instruction and Communication Technology

Independent Departments
Department of Andragogy and General Culture
Department of Ethnic and Minority Studies
Department of Pedagogy
Department of Psychology
Department of Social Pedagogy

Service providing organisational units
Foreign Language Unit
Lyceum TV

Faculty of Economics and Social Sciences

Institute of Economic Sciences
Department of Economics and Business Law
Department of Business Administration
Department of Tourism
Specialised Foreign Language Unit

Independent Departments
Department of Communication and Media Science
Department of Political Science

Faculty of Natural Sciences

Institute of Mathematics and Informatics
Department of Applied Mathematics
Department of Information Technology
Department of Mathematics
Department of Computer Science

Biology Institute
Department of Zoology
Department of Plant Physiology
Department of Environmental Science

Institute of Food Science
Department of Food and Wine Chemistry
Department of Chemistry, Viticulture Chemistry, and Viticulture
Department of Microbiology and Food Technology

Physical Education and Sports Science Institute
Department of Sports Activities
Department of Sport Science and Methodology
Department of Body Culture Theory

Service providing organisational units
Foreign Language Unit
Natural Science Career Orientation and Methodological Centre (Magic Tower)

Notable students
Margit Sebők (1939–2000), Hungarian painter and educator
Géza Gárdonyi, writer
Tamás Cseh, musician

See also
 Open access in Hungary

References

1774 establishments in the Habsburg monarchy
18th-century establishments in Hungary
Universities and colleges in Hungary